The 1955–56 Scottish League Cup was the tenth season of Scotland's second football knockout competition. The competition was won Aberdeen, who defeated St Mirren in the Final.

First round

Group 1

Group 2

Group 3

Group 4

Group 5

Group 6

Group 7

Group 8

Group 9

Supplementary Round

First Leg

Second Leg

Quarter-finals

First Leg

Second Leg

Replay

Semi-finals

Ties

Replay

Final

References

General

Specific

1955–56 in Scottish football
Scottish League Cup seasons